The Ampère Museum is a museum of the history of electricity dedicated to André-Marie Ampère (1775-1836). It was awarded the "Maisons des Illustres" (Illustrious house) label in 2013.

History  
In 1928, Hernand and Sosthenes Behn, American businessmen, of French origin by their mother, co-founders of the multinational company ITT, which at that time was developing its activities in France, on the advice of Paul Janet and as patrons of the arts, acquired the former Ampère property which had just been put up for sale. They donated it to the "Société française des électriciens", which two years later entrusted it to the "Société des amis d'André-Marie Ampère". The museum was inaugurated on 1 July 1931.

Exhibitions  

The museum consists of two buildings with a total of eleven exhibition rooms, with the "guest room" of the house on the ground floor. Audioguides in French and English are available to visitors.

The museum also has a separate room, "L'espace Ampère", with seating for 50 people, which can accommodate colloquiums or meetings.

Visitors will find models reproducing the fundamental experiments in electromagnetism carried out by Ampère and certain physicists of his time as Hans Christian Ørsted, Michael Faraday and many others. The public can put them into operation, find explanations and additional information, play games and thus be initiated by experience and in a playful way to the laws of electromagnetism.

In one of the rooms the visitor finds portraits, books and manuscripts associated with the Ampère family: André-Marie Ampère (1775-1836) as well as his father Jean-Jacques (1733-1793) and his son Jean-Jacques Ampère (1800-1864).

Other rooms allow visitors to travel through the history of electricity to the production of renewable energy with wind turbines, photovoltaic plants, etc..

The museum shop offers a few books and souvenirs.

Science school   
The museum offers one-day or half-day visits to contribute to pedagogical projects, from elementary school to high schools and even beyond.

References 

Museums in France
Maisons des Illustres